"I'm No Stranger to the Rain" is a song recorded by American country music artist Keith Whitley. It was released in January 1989 as the fifth and final single from his album Don't Close Your Eyes, and was the last single released during Whitley's lifetime. It peaked at number-one in both the United States and Canada. Joe Diffie covered the song on Whitley's 1995 tribute album.  It was written by Sonny Curtis and Ron Hellard.

The song won Single of the Year at the Country Music Association Awards in 1989 after Whitley's death.

Music video
A music video was filmed for this song. It features Keith and his band playing at the former Douglas Corner Cafe in Nashville.

Chart positions

Year-end charts

References

1989 singles
Keith Whitley songs
Joe Diffie songs
Song recordings produced by Garth Fundis
Songs written by Sonny Curtis
RCA Records Nashville singles
1988 songs
Songs written by Ron Hellard